The Experimental Oculina Research Reserve preserves the Oculina Banks, a reef of ivory bush coral (Oculina varicosa) off the coast of Fort Pierce, Florida. Oculina varicosa is a U.S. National Marine Fisheries Service species of concern. Species of concern are those species about which the U.S. Government's National Oceanic and Atmospheric Administration (NOAA), National Marine Fisheries Service, has some concerns regarding status and threats, but for which insufficient information is available to indicate a need to list the species under the U.S. Endangered Species Act (ESA).

Location 
In 1984, a 92 square-nautical-mile (316 km2) portion of these reefs was designated the Oculina Habitat Area of Particular Concern.  In 1994, the area was closed to all manner of bottom fishing and was redesignated a research reserve. In 2000, the marine protected area was expanded to 300 square nautical miles (1,030 km2) and prohibited all gears that caused mechanical disruption to the habitat.

Conservation 
Commercial and recreational harvesters heavily exploited reef fish, such as grouper and snapper, prior to the establishment of the reserve, and extensive areas of ivory bush coral habitat had been reduced to rubble by trawling or dredging, with few or no living coral colonies remaining in sections of the bank. Reef fish populations in the impacted areas have become sparse.  The reserve is now undergoing habitat restoration projects.

References

External links 
 A Particular Concern: Protecting Deep-Sea Corals
 The Experimental Oculina Research Reserve: Oculina Habitat Restoration
 Oculina Coral Banks 2002
 Oculina Coral Banks 2003
 Experimental Oculina Research Reserve

Fort Pierce, Florida
Marine reserves of the United States
Nature reserves in Florida
Protected areas of St. Lucie County, Florida
1994 establishments in Florida
Protected areas established in 1994